Bino and Fino is an educational children's cartoon created by Nigerian animator Adamu Waziri. It features a brother and sister, Bino and Fino. With the magical Zeena the Butterfly, they learn about African history and culture. Since 2010 it has been broadcast in over 15 countries, in numerous languages including English, Twi, Yoruba, German, Dutch, Portuguese, Hausa, Igbo, French and Swahili.

It has been compared to Charlie and Lola and Dora the Explorer.

References

External links 

 Bino and Fino - African Culture For Children
 BinoandFino - YouTube

Nigerian children's animated television series
Black cartoons
Fictional Nigerian people
Fictional black people